Jamie Christine Lim is a Filipino karateka. She won the gold medal in the women's kumite +61kg event at the 2019 Southeast Asian Games held in the Philippines.

In June 2021, Lim competed at the World Olympic Qualification Tournament held in Paris, France hoping to qualify for the 2020 Summer Olympics in Tokyo, Japan. In November 2021, she competed in the women's 61kg event at the World Karate Championships held in Dubai, United Arab Emirates. In December 2021, she won the silver medal in the women's kumite 61kg event at the Asian Karate Championships held in Almaty, Kazakhstan.

Lim won two bronze medals at the 2021 Southeast Asian Games held in Hanoi, Vietnam.

Her father is former PBA legend Samboy Lim. She also graduated as summa cum laude in UP Diliman with a degree in BS Mathematics.

Achievements

References 

Living people
Year of birth missing (living people)
Place of birth missing (living people)
Filipino female karateka
Southeast Asian Games gold medalists for the Philippines
Southeast Asian Games bronze medalists for the Philippines
Southeast Asian Games medalists in karate
Competitors at the 2019 Southeast Asian Games
Competitors at the 2021 Southeast Asian Games
21st-century Filipino women